Vital Viktaravich Radzivonaw (born 11 December 1983) is a Belarusian former professional footballer who played as a forward. He spent most of his career with BATE Borisov. After retirement, he stayed in BATE as the team's sporting director.

Club career 
Rodionov began his career in Lokomotiv-96 Vitebsk, before being scouted from Torpedo Zhodino. He played 57 games for Torpedo, before being transferred to BATE Borisov in 2005. On 10 January 2009, he was loaned out from BATE Borisov, until summer 2009 to SC Freiburg, who had an option of purchase, but selected not to use it. On 24 May 2012, Rodionov scored twice in the 2–0 win over Minsk and became the top scorer for BATE in the Belarusian Premier League with 57 goals, surpassing Vitali Kutuzov's record of 56 goals that had been set between 1998 and 2001. On 19 September 2012, Rodionov scored the second goal in BATE's 3–1 away victory over LOSC Lille, which was the first Champions League group stage win in the team's history. On 2 October 2012, he also scored in BATE's first group match home win in the Champions League – a 3–1 success against Bayern München. As of July 2016, he has netted 20 goals in European tournaments, the most of any Belarusian player.

International career 
Rodionov was a member of the Belarus national team and represented his country in Euro and World Cup qualifiers.

Career statistics 
Scores and results list Belarus goal tally first, score column indicates score after each Rodionov goal.

Honours 
BATE Borisov
 Belarusian Premier League: 2006, 2007, 2008, 2009, 2010, 2011, 2012, 2013, 2014, 2015, 2016, 2017
 Belarusian Cup: 2005–06, 2009–10, 2014–15
 Belarusian Super Cup: 2010, 2013, 2014, 2015, 2016, 2017

Individual
 CIS Cup top goalscorer: 2007 (shared)
 Best forward in the Belarusian Premier League for the 2010 and 2011 seasons
 Listed among the 22 best players in the Belarusian Premier League (2005, 2007, 2008, 2010, 2011)
 Top scorer in the Belarusian Premier League in 2008 (honor shared with Gennadi Bliznyuk), 2013 and 2016 (shared with Mikhail Gordeichuk).
 Second place in the 2012 Belarusian Footballer of the Year rankings

References

External links 
 
 

1983 births
Living people
Sportspeople from Vitebsk
Belarusian footballers
Belarus international footballers
Belarusian expatriate footballers
Expatriate footballers in Germany
2. Bundesliga players
FC Vitebsk players
FC Torpedo-BelAZ Zhodino players
FC BATE Borisov players
SC Freiburg players
Association football forwards